Nora Morales de Cortiñas (born March 22, 1930 in Buenos Aires), better known as Nora (or "Norita") Cortiñas, is a social psychologist, activist and defender of Argentine human rights. She is a co-founder of Mothers of the Plaza de Mayo and later of "Madres de Plaza de Mayo Línea Fundadora".

Career
Cortiñas is a social psychologist and professor at the Faculty of Economic Sciences at the University of Buenos Aires. Since 1998, she has held the chair of "Economic Power and Human Rights".

Her son, Gustavo Cortiñas, a member of the Justicialist Party and the Montoneros organization in Villa 31 neighborhood of Buenos Aires. was arrested and disappeared in Castelar, Buenos Aires Province, on April 15, 1977, when he was working in the Argentine Ministry of Economy after having previously passed through National Institute of Statistics and Census of Argentina and the National Securities Commission, by members of the Armed Forces.

Since 1977, Cortiñas has been part of the Madres de Plaza de Mayo Línea Fundadora, who demand that the authorities punish those guilty of the kidnappings, torture and forced disappearances of approximately 30,000 people during the military dictatorship from 1976 to 1983. She travels through all continents calling for solidarity with the families of the disappeared and the punishment of those guilty of crimes against humanity in their country. As a university professor, she has carried out analyses and studies on the relationship between the military dictatorship, foreign debt and the economic crisis in Argentina.

She showed her support for the cause of legal abortion, being a speaker at the Ni una menos march on June 4, 2018 in favor of it.7

Awards and honours
 2000, Doctor Honoris Causa, Université libre de Bruxelles, Belgium
 2004, Doctor Honoris Causa, National University of Salta
 2012, Doctor Honoris Causa, University of Buenos Aires  
 2019, Doctor Honoris Causa, National University of Entre Ríos
 2019, Human Rights Award, shared with Victoire Ingabire Umuhoza

References

1930 births
Living people